Journey to the End of Coal is a French web documentary directed by Samuel Bollendorff and Abel Segretin.

Based on the choose your own adventure principle, the interactive documentary tells the story of millions of Chinese coal miners who are risking their lives to satisfy their country's appetite for economic growth.

Award 
Journey to the End of Coal won the Prix SCAM 2009 digital interactive artwork award .

Special screenings
  IDFA Doclab, Amsterdam – November 2008 
  Cinema du Réel, Paris – March 2009
  South by Southwest, Austin, Texas – March 2009
  Visions du Réel festival, Nyon, Switzerland – April 2009
  Sunny Side of The Doc, La Rochelle, France – June 2009
  Festival des 4 Ecrans, Paris, France – October 2009
  Sheffield Doc/Fest'', Sheffield, UK – November 2009

References

External links

 Journey to the end of coal

Read also
 http://chinadigitaltimes.net/2009/09/video-journey-to-the-end-of-coal/
 https://web.archive.org/web/20100526141641/http://www.innovativeinteractivity.com/2009/09/07/honytonk-and-31septembre-introduce-interactive-documentary/

French documentary films
2008 films
Documentary films about mining
Coal mining
Web documentaries
Environmental websites
Documentary films about China
Mining in China
Coal in China
Mine safety
Documentary films about geology
2000s French films